Ernest Emako Siankam  (born 21 February 1981) is a Cameroonian footballer who plays for Churchill Brothers SC as a forward in I-League.

Emako Siankam previously spent three seasons playing for FC Volyn Lutsk in the Ukrainian Premier League.

References

External links
 

1981 births
Living people
Cameroonian footballers
Cameroonian expatriate footballers
Association football forwards
Racing Club Bafoussam players
Salgaocar FC players
FC Volyn Lutsk players
Nîmes Olympique players
Chengdu Tiancheng F.C. players
Chongqing Liangjiang Athletic F.C. players
China League One players
Ukrainian Premier League players
Expatriate footballers in Ukraine
Cameroonian expatriate sportspeople in Ukraine
Expatriate footballers in Azerbaijan
Expatriate footballers in France
Expatriate footballers in China
Expatriate footballers in Indonesia
Expatriate footballers in India
Cameroonian expatriate sportspeople in India
Cameroonian expatriate sportspeople in Azerbaijan
FK Genclerbirliyi Sumqayit players